James Dyrenforth (31 January 1895 – 26 December 1973) was an American actor and songwriter.

Dyrenforth appeared in A Night to Remember (1958), Fiend Without a Face (1958), and Lolita (1962), and co-wrote "A Garden in the Rain", a song which was covered by Frank Sinatra and Sarah Vaughan, among others. He wrote lyrics for The Golden Year, a BBC television play of 1951.

Filmography

References

External links

1895 births
1973 deaths
American male actors
American emigrants to England
American male songwriters
Musicians from Chicago
20th-century American musicians
Songwriters from Illinois
20th-century American male musicians